Antônio Rinaldo Gonçalves, commonly known simply as Rinaldo (born 31 October 1966) is a Brazilian former footballer. He played for several Campeonato Brasileiro Série A clubs. He also played for Portuguese Liga clubs and for the Brazil national team.

Career
Born in Campina Grande, Paraíba state, Rinaldo started his professional career playing for Campinense, then moving to their rivals Treze. He played 36 Série A games for Santa Cruz between 1987 and 1988, scoring five goals. He then joined Fluminense, playing 21 Série A games and scoring seven goals for the Rio de Janeiro-based club. With São Paulo, Rinaldo played 15 Série A games, scoring two goals, between 1991 and 1992. Including other competition games, he played 28 games for São Paulo, and scored four goals. In 1992, he played four Copa do Brasil games for Sport Recife, scoring four goals. He left the club after the 1993 season. After leaving Sport Recife, he played for Portuguesa, then Portuguese Liga clubs Marítimo and Moreirense, Juventude, and in 1994 Kärnten of Austria, when he retired and moved to Recife city.

National team
Rinaldo played only one game for the Brazil national team, in 1990. It was a friendly game against a Rest of the World combined team to celebrate Pelé's 50th birthday. The game was played on 31 October 1990, at Stadio San Siro, Milan, Italy, and Brazil was defeated 2–1. The game is notorious because after Rinaldo received a pass from Pelé, instead of returning the ball to him, he shot the ball, missing the goal, and preventing Pelé from scoring his 1282nd goal.

References

External links

1966 births
Living people
Brazilian footballers
Brazilian expatriate footballers
Brazil international footballers
Campinense Clube players
Treze Futebol Clube players
Santa Cruz Futebol Clube players
Fluminense FC players
São Paulo FC players
Sport Club do Recife players
Associação Portuguesa de Desportos players
C.S. Marítimo players
Esporte Clube Juventude players
J1 League players
Gamba Osaka players
Expatriate footballers in Austria
Brazilian expatriate sportspeople in Hong Kong
Expatriate footballers in Portugal
Expatriate footballers in Hong Kong
Expatriate footballers in Japan
Brazilian expatriate sportspeople in Austria
Association football forwards
Sportspeople from Paraíba